The Torneo Pampeano is a regional rugby union competition in Argentina. 

The competition started in 2009 and involves clubs from the unions of Mar del Plata and Sur. 

This annual tournament has traditionally been dominated by Mar del Plata clubs. As in other inter-provincial tournaments, such as the Torneo del Litoral or Torneo del Noroeste, the best clubs from the Torneo Pampeano qualify for the national level Torneo del Interior.

Championships
The Torneo Pampeano includes 10 teams competing for the provincial title. All the champions are listed below:

Titles

Titles by club

References

External links
Unión de Rugby de Mar del Plata

Rugby union leagues in Argentina